Tuibuang is a subdivision in Churachandpur district of Manipur, India.

References

Churachandpur
Kuki tribes